Kyushu Institute of Design (九州芸術工科大学; Kyūshū Geijutsu Kōka Daigaku, KID) in Fukuoka, Japan, is one of Japan's prestigious national universities and was founded in April, 1968.  The university combines the disciplines of Architecture, Industrial Design, Visual Communication Design, Acoustic Design and Art and Information Design.

In October, 2003, Kyushu Institute of Design became Kyushu University's Graduate School of Design.  Until 2005, however, all KID graduates have been issued diplomas from Kyushu Institute of Design.

See also 
Kyushu Institute of Technology
Kyushu University
Kyoto University
University of Tokyo

External links
Kyushu Institute of Design website
Kyushu University Faculty, Graduate School, and School of Design

Japanese national universities
Universities and colleges in Fukuoka Prefecture